Tropidia insularis is a species of hoverfly in the family Syrphidae.

Distribution
Argentina.

References

Eristalinae
Diptera of South America
Insects described in 1892